The 2000 Monmouth Hawks football team represented Monmouth University in the 2000 NCAA Division I-AA football season as a member of the Northeast Conference (NEC). The Hawks were led by eighth-year head coach Kevin Callahan and played their home games at Kessler Field. They finished the season 5–6 overall and 4–4 in NEC play to place fifth.

Schedule

References

Monmouth
Monmouth Hawks football seasons
Monmouth Hawks football